Alexandre-Marie Colin (1798-1875) was a French painter of historical and genre subjects.

Biography 
Colin was born in Paris in 1798. He was a pupil of Girodet and close friend of Eugène Delacroix, Achille Devéria, and others. He and Delacroix shared a studio during the 1820s and even lithographed each other's works. His religious and historical paintings are characterised by a style based on a careful study of the old masters, while his genre pieces are vigorous and lifelike. Among the latter may be noticed his French Fish-Market (1832) in the Alte Nationalgalerie in Berlin, and his Gipsies Resting. Among the former may be named Christopher Columbus, Flight into Egypt, and Assumption of the Virgin. He also illustrated scenes for literary works, such as Shakespeare's Othello and Macbeth.
Colin had four children with two wives: Anaïs, Héloïse, Laure, and Paul, all of whom followed in his footsteps as painters. He gradually modified his style during his long career, making it acceptable to salon juries who rejected several early works from the 1820s because of the very painterly qualities we admire today.

He died in 1875.

References

External links 

 Biography of Colin in the Web Gallery of Art
 Works by Colin in the Metropolitan Museum of Art
Works by Colin at the Rijksmuseum
 Works by Colin in ArtNet

1798 births
1875 deaths
Painters from Paris
19th-century French painters
French romantic painters
French male painters
French portrait painters
19th-century French lithographers
École des Beaux-Arts alumni
19th-century French male artists
18th-century French male artists